Nelya Sevostiyanova (born 24 November 1973) is a Kazakhstani fencer. She competed in the women's individual foil event at the 2000 Summer Olympics.

References

External links
 

1973 births
Living people
Russian female foil fencers
Kazakhstani female foil fencers
Olympic fencers of Kazakhstan
Fencers at the 2000 Summer Olympics
Sportspeople from Almaty